Ana Yilian Cleger Abel (born 27 November 1989) is a Cuban volleyball player. She was part of the Cuba women's national volleyball team.

She participated at the 2010 FIVB Volleyball Women's World Championship in Japan. 
She left the Cuban team before the 2013 FIVB Volleyball World Grand Prix.
She played with Santiago de Cuba, and for VakıfBank Istanbul at the 2017–18 CEV Women's Champions League.

Clubs
  Santiago de Cuba (2010)
  Vakıfbank S.K. (2018)

Awards

Individuals 
2017-18 CEV Champions League "Best Opposite Spiker"

Clubs
 2017–18 CEV Champions League -  Runner-Up, with CSM Volei Alba Blaj

References

External links
https://volleymob.com/former-cuban-national-team-player-ana-cleger-signs-anakent-sports/
CEV profile

1989 births
Living people
Cuban women's volleyball players
Place of birth missing (living people)
Volleyball players at the 2011 Pan American Games
Pan American Games silver medalists for Cuba
Pan American Games medalists in volleyball
Cuban expatriates in Romania
Expatriate volleyball players in Romania
Opposite hitters
Medalists at the 2011 Pan American Games